UFC 96: Jackson vs. Jardine was a mixed martial arts event held by the Ultimate Fighting Championship (UFC). It was held in Columbus, Ohio on March 7, 2009 at Nationwide Arena.

Background
The card was headlined by a Light Heavyweight bout between Quinton Jackson and Keith Jardine.  Following the main event, Rashad Evans, training partner of Jardine and then-Light Heavyweight Champion, entered the cage and publicly challenged Jackson. It resulted in a long-standing feud between the two that would not be settled until 2010.

A Welterweight bout between Dustin Hazelett and Ben Saunders was originally scheduled for this card, but was cancelled when Hazelett was injured.

Saunders was then scheduled to face replacement Ryan Madigan, but that bout was also cancelled when Saunders suffered a shattered toe in training. Madigan eventually faced Tamdan McCrory on this card.

Results

Bonus awards
Fighters were awarded $60,000 bonuses.

Fight of the Night: Quinton Jackson vs. Keith Jardine
Knockout of the Night: Matt Hamill
Submission of the Night: Not awarded as no matches ended with submission

Purses
 Quinton Jackson ($325,000 – includes $100,000 win bonus) def. Keith Jardine ($55,000)
 Shane Carwin ($32,000 – includes $16,000 win bonus) def. Gabriel Gonzaga ($60,000)
 Matt Brown ($16,000 – includes $8,000 win bonus) def. Pete Sell ($12,000)
 Matt Hamill ($40,000 – includes $20,000 win bonus) def. Mark Muñoz ($12,000)
 Gray Maynard ($20,000 – includes $10,000 win bonus) def. Jim Miller ($9,000)
 Tamdan McCrory ($20,000 – includes $10,000 win bonus) def. Ryan Madigan ($3,000)
 Kendall Grove ($44,000 – includes $22,000 win bonus) def. Jason Day ($5,000)
 Jason Brilz ($10,000 – includes $5,000 win bonus) def. Tim Boetsch ($12,000)
 Brandon Vera ($60,000 – includes $30,000 win bonus) def. Michael Patt ($5,000)
 Shane Nelson ($16,000 – includes $8,000 win bonus) def. Aaron Riley ($6,000)

See also
 Ultimate Fighting Championship
 List of UFC champions
 List of UFC events
 2009 in UFC

References

Ultimate Fighting Championship events
2009 in mixed martial arts
Mixed martial arts in Ohio
2009 in sports in Ohio
Sports competitions in Columbus, Ohio
Events in Columbus, Ohio